Kiwibank Limited is a New Zealand state-owned bank and financial services provider. As of 2023, they are the fifth-largest bank in New Zealand by assets, and the largest New Zealand-owned bank, with a market share of approximately 9%.

Kiwibank was established in 2001 by the Fifth Labour Government of New Zealand, following a proposal by then Deputy Prime Minister Jim Anderton, to set up a locally-owned bank capable of competing with the Big Four Australian banks which dominated the domestic market. It was set up as a subsidiary of New Zealand Post, with branches originally co-located within PostShops (post offices) to maximise its national reach.

History

Earlier state-owned banks
Kiwibank is similar in many respects to an earlier post office-based bank owned by the New Zealand Government. The New Zealand Post Office Bank was established in 1867. In 1987, the bank was corporatised and separated from New Zealand Post and Telecom New Zealand to form a stand-alone company – PostBank. Then in 1989 PostBank was sold by the government to ANZ.

Establishment period (2002–2010)
The bank originated from Alliance Party policy during the 1999—2002 term of the Labour-led coalition government.

Jim Anderton revealed in his valedictory speech that after the issue had previously been discussed by cabinet for months, he had spent three hours trying to convince then Finance Minister Michael Cullen, Annette King told Cullen: "Michael, Jim's beaten back every argument against the bank we've ever put up. For God's sake, give him the bloody bank." Cullen replied: "Oh, all right then."

Kiwibank launched in 2002 with 211 branches open nationwide by 30 June.

In 2008, one analysis saw Kiwibank as having fostered a new level of competition in banking in New Zealand in terms of lower fees and growth in service. As of 2007, Kiwibank had higher customer-satisfaction ratings than the four large Australian-owned trading-banks.

In 2008 Kiwibank unveiled an advertising campaign, "Join The Movement", which portrayed foreign-owned competitors as enemy occupiers. The New Zealand Herald called the campaign "jingoistic".

2010–present day 
Kiwibank announced an after tax profit of $21.2 million for the year ended 30 June 2011.

In 2012 Kiwibank celebrated its ten-year birthday. The advertising campaign used 10-year-old Kiwis pledging what they're standing up for with New Zealand musician Neil Finn agreeing to the use of his song "Can you hear us?" re-recorded by Jeremy Redmore of Midnight Youth. It was the first time the artist had allowed one of his tracks to be used by a commercial entity. The proceeds from the first 20,000 downloads of the soundtrack went to the NZ Music Foundation of which Finn is patron.

In 2012, the bank also released an iPhone mobile banking app, following the roll out of a redesigned Kiwibank website. Standard & Poor lowered Kiwibank's credit rating one level from AA- to A+ (outlook stable) and Kiwibank reported a record after tax profit of $79.1 million for the year ended 30 June 2012.

In 2014, Kiwibank launched its "Independence" advertising campaign where it "compares itself to anyone who has ever immigrated to New Zealand".

In 2016, New Zealand Post announced a successful completion of the sale of 47 percent of Kiwibank to the New Zealand Superannuation Fund (25 percent) and the Accident Compensation Corporation (ACC) (22 percent). The $494 million deal values KGHL at $1,050 million and retains NZ Post as the majority owner of Kiwibank as well as keeping the bank fully New Zealand owned.

On 22 August 2022, the New Zealand Government purchased Kiwibank's holdings company Kiwi Group Holdings for an estimated NZ$2.1 billion. As a result, the Government acquired full control of the state-owned bank from the New Zealand Superannuation Fund, ACC, and New Zealand Post. In response to the Government's purchase of Kiwibank, KiwiSaver providers opined that the Government could have offered to partially sell shares to the public. The opposition ACT Party's leader David Seymour called for a partial sale of Kiwibank's shares to pension funds. Similarly, the opposition National Party questioned the Labour Government's ability to run Kiwibank.

Core business activities

Kiwibank's core business consists of personal banking, business banking, KiwiSaver and other wealth services.

Kiwibank Personal Banking 

Personal banking products and services include home loans, personal loans, credit cards, everyday accounts, savings accounts, investment services and insurance products.

Kiwibank Business Banking 

Business Banking products and services include business lending, cheque accounts, credit cards, investments, merchant services, payment services and insurance.

International Services 

This includes online and manual international money transfers, foreign exchange and Foreign Currency Accounts and travellers' cheques.

Investments 
Kiwibank invested NZ$8m into a 51% shareholding in New Zealand Home Loans, a home loan lender specialising in debt reduction, in June 2006, and increased this in 2008 by a further 25% and took 100% in 2012. New Zealand Home Loans continues to grow offering an alternative to the traditional banking model and have a nationwide network of over 75 franchises.

In 2012, Kiwi Group Holdings (the parent company of Kiwibank) purchased Gareth Morgan Investments (GMI) for an undisclosed sum. In August 2013 GMI reached a milestone of $2 billion funds under management.

In 2015, Gareth Morgan Investments (GMI) was re-branded to Kiwi Wealth, offering global investment management and private portfolio services to retail high-net-worth, pension funds and institutional clients.

In 2018, Kiwi Wealth's asset under management (AUM) surpass $6 billion.

Awards 
Kiwibank has won the Sunday Star Times/Cannex banking awards, in 2006, 2007, 2008, 2009, 2010 and 2012 for offering the best value across their range of products. It has also won New Zealand's Most Trusted Bank at the Reader's Digest Trusted Brand Awards from 2006 to 2017.

CANSTAR Awards include:
Bank of the Year for First Home Buyers 2011, 2012, 2013, 2014, 2015, 2015, 2016, 2017 
Best Value Term Deposit Award 2015, 2014, 2016
Other awards won by Kiwibank include:
Bank of the Year - New Zealand, The Banker, 2009, 2010
Sunday Star-Times' Bank of the Year, 2006, 2007, 2008, 2009, 2010, 2012
Global Finance Best Bank in New Zealand 2013
Supreme Award from the AUT Business School Excellence in Business Support Awards 2013
Roy Morgan Major Bank of the Year Award 2012, 2013, 2014, 2015, 2015, 2016
In 2015 the Kiwi Wealth KiwiSaver Scheme (run by GMI) was awarded the inaugural Consumer NZ People's Choice Award.

Sponsorships
Kiwibank was one of the major sponsors of The Block NZ from 2012 - 2014.

In 2012 it took up sponsorship of the CFA Institute Research Challenge hosted by the CFA Society of New Zealand.

New Zealand's first FinTech Accelerator was set up in 2016 with Kiwibank sponsorship. The 2018 Kiwibank FinTech Accelerator three month business growth programme resulted in seven start ups and was also supported by Xero, MasterCard and Microsoft. The businesses were: AccountingPod, Tapi (formally FlatFish), Liberac, Sharesies, Teddy, Wicket and a Xero team. In July 2019 the Kiwibank FinTech Accelerator intake included BankEngine, Cove Insurance, and Miuwi.

Corporate social responsibility 
Kiwibank is the major sponsor of the New Zealander of the Year Awards

A partnership with the children's financial literacy provider Banqer was formally launched in May 2016, setting the one-year goal at 1000 classrooms being sponsored into the programme. This was achieved by April 2017 but the programme continues to grow.

In 2016 Kiwibank announced a partnership with the Predator Free New Zealand Trust and the Department of Conservation (DOC). Kiwibank worked with PFNZ to establish the Kiwibank Predator Free Communities Programme which works with communities wanting to take up the predator-free challenge. The DOC partnership is centered around the Conservation Dogs programme which piloted New Zealand's first specialist conservation dog unit with two full-time dog handlers. At the time there were 80 conservation dogs in New Zealand, 45 of whom find protected species and 35 who find pests.

See also 

 List of banks
 List of banks in New Zealand

References

External links

 
 New Zealand Post
 New Zealand Home Loans

Banks of New Zealand
Banks established in 2002
Financial services companies of New Zealand
Companies based in Wellington
New Zealand companies established in 2002
Postal savings system
Government-owned companies of New Zealand